These are the official results of the Men's 5,000 metres event at the 1994 European Championships in Helsinki, Finland, held at Helsinki Olympic Stadium on 11 and 14 August 1994.

Medalists

Final

Heats

Participation
According to an unofficial count, 21 athletes from 12 countries participated in the event.

 (1)
 (2)
 (2)
 (1)
 (2)
 (2)
 (1)
 (3)
 (1)
 (3)
 (1)
 (2)

See also
 1992 Men's Olympic 5,000 metres (Barcelona)
 1993 Men's World Championships 5,000 metres (Stuttgart)
 1995 Men's World Championships 5,000 metres (Gothenburg)
 1996 Men's Olympic 5,000 metres (Atlanta)

References

 Results

5000
5000 metres at the European Athletics Championships